Cand.med.vet ( (male/female) ) or "candidate of veterinary medicine" is an academic degree awarded in Scandinavian countries following a 5,5 to 6 year veterinary medical school education. It is equivalent with the same kind of degrees given in other countries, like: DVM, VDM, BVSc, BVM&S etc., which also opens for authorization as a veterinarian.

Awarding institutions
In Norway the degree is given by NMBU (former NVH) located in Campus Adamstuen in Oslo, Norway. In Denmark by the University of Copenhagen, and in Sweden by the Swedish University of Agricultural sciences, the only educational institutions in the Scandinavian countries to offer the veterinary degree. In Norway the title is one of few academic titles to remain unchanged during the "Quality reform" changes of 2002-2003, along with cand.med (human medicine), cand.psychol (psychology), cand.theol (religious studies).

References

Veterinary education
Academic degrees of Norway
Master's degrees